
Year 396 BC was a year of the pre-Julian Roman calendar. At the time, it was known as the Year of the Tribunate of Saccus, Capitolinus, Esquilinus, Augurinus, Capitolinus and Priscus (or, less frequently, year 358 Ab urbe condita). The denomination 396 BC for this year has been used since the early medieval period, when the Anno Domini calendar era became the prevalent method in Europe for naming years.

Events 
 By place 
 Persian Empire 
 The Persians assemble a joint Phoenician, Cilician, and Cypriot fleet, under the command of the experienced Athenian admiral, Conon, and seize Rhodes.

 Carthage 
 The Carthaginians are forced to abandon their siege of Syracuse (begun in 398 BC), but destroy Messina. Dionysius' first war with Carthage ends with a notable victory for Dionysius, who confines his enemy's power to an area of northwest Sicily. On his return home, the Carthaginian general, Himilco, commits suicide.

 Greece 
 Agesilaus II, the King of Sparta, campaigns successfully in Asia Minor against the Persian satraps Pharnabazus and Tissaphernes and inflicts a major defeat on Tissaphernes at Sardis. Agesilaus agrees to a three months' truce with the Persians under Tissaphernes, the satrap of Lydia and Caria. Negotiations conducted during that time prove fruitless, and on its termination, Agesilaus raids Phrygia, where he easily captures an immense amount of booty, since Tissaphernes has concentrated his troops in Caria.

 Roman Republic 
 Marcus Furius Camillus is made dictator by the Romans. Camillus finally destroys the Etruscan city of Veii in southern Etruria as the town falls to Roman forces after what is said to be a 10 year siege. The capture of Veii and its surrounding territories marks the first major expansion of Rome which doubles its territory after this victory.
 The Romans introduce pay for their army.

 By topic 
 Literature 
 Plato publishes his Apologia, which is a defence of his mentor Socrates.

 Sports 
 Kyniska becomes the first woman to win an event at the Olympic Games when the horse-drawn chariot she sponsors crosses the finish line first, even though the prohibition on women competing forces her to hire a man to drive it.

Births 
 Lycurgus, Athenian statesman and orator (d. 323 BC)
 Xenocrates, Greek philosopher and scholarch (or rector) of the Academy (d. 314 BC)

Deaths 
 Himilco, Carthaginian general

References